Indonesian Atheists (IA) is a community that accommodates atheists, agnostics, and irreligious in Indonesia. The community provides a place for Indonesian nonbelievers to express their opinions. IA was founded by Karl Karnadi in October 2008.

Although most of the activities of IA are still limited on the Internet, several public gatherings have been held in Jakarta and other cities. Members are gathered through social networks such Facebook and Twitter.

IA is also an associate member of Atheist Alliance International.

Footnotes

External links
 
 
 
 Indonesian Atheists in SEA-Atheist.org

Skeptic organizations based in Indonesia
Religion in Indonesia
Internet properties established in 2008
Organizations established in 2008
2008 establishments in Indonesia